Tuberculosis is a disease caused by the bacterium Mycobacterium tuberculosis. The nature of the host-pathogen interaction between humans and M. tuberculosis is considered to have a genetic component. A group of rare disorders called Mendelian Susceptibility to Mycobacterial Diseases (MSMD) was observed in a subset of individuals with a genetic defect that results in increased susceptibility to Mycobacterial infection.

Genome-wide association studies 
Early case and twin studies have indicated that genetic component are important in host susceptibility to M. Tuberculosis. Recent Genome-wide association studies (GWAS) have identified three genetic risk loci, including at positions 3q23, 11p13 and 18q11. As is common in GWAS, the variants discovered have moderate effect sizes - but have shown that TB has high polygenic heritability. These studies suggest that while only a handful of alleles have been found, larger well designed studies may find more.

References

Tuberculosis